Nicholas Jay Bjugstad (born July 17, 1992) is an American professional ice hockey forward for the Edmonton Oilers of the National Hockey League (NHL). He was selected by the Florida Panthers in the first round (19th overall) of the 2010 NHL Entry Draft.

Playing career

Amateur
During the summer of 2008, Bjugstad turned down an invitation to train with the USA Hockey National Team Development Program out of a sense of loyalty to his high school teammates. Bjugstad finished his high school career with Blaine High School in 2010 after helping to bring the school to three consecutive Minnesota State High School Hockey Tournaments. He was named Mr. Hockey in 2009–10. While in high school, Bjugstad accelerated his schooling by taking summer classes and online courses, enabling him to graduate a year earlier than expected.

Bjugstad began his collegiate career at the University of Minnesota in 2010 playing for the Golden Gophers, where he totaled 54 goals and 44 assists during his three years while the team won two WCHA championships.

Professional

Florida Panthers
Bjugstad left the Gophers after his junior season, signing a three-year entry-level deal with the Florida Panthers on April 3, 2013. He immediately joined the last-placed Panthers to end the 2012–13 season, and scored his first NHL goal against Anders Lindbäck in Florida's season finale victory over the Tampa Bay Lightning on April 27, 2013. Bjugstad led the Panthers in points with 38, and third in goals with 16, during 2013–14, his first full-length season in the NHL, where he spent the majority of the season on the team's first line. On December 31, 2014, Bjugstad signed a six-year contract extension with the Panthers worth $24.6 million.

Bjugstad's 2016–17 season was riddled with injuries including a broken hand, and a lower body injury that contributed to him setting a new career low in points since his rookie year.

Bjugstad rebounded from his disappointing previous season by setting career highs in points, assists, and games played during his 2017–18 campaign. Bjugstad recorded his first career hat trick in the NHL on March 6, 2018 against the Tampa Bay Lightning.

Pittsburgh Penguins
During the 2018–19 season, on February 1, 2019, Bjugstad along with teammate Jared McCann, was traded to the Pittsburgh Penguins in exchange for Derick Brassard, Riley Sheahan, a 2nd round pick, and two 4th round picks.

Minnesota Wild
On September 11, 2020, Bjugstad was traded to the Minnesota Wild in exchange for a conditional pick in the 2021 NHL Entry Draft. In the pandemic delayed 2020–21 season, becoming the 27th Minnesota native to play for the Wild, Bjugstad recorded 6 goals and 17 points in 44 games.

As a pending unrestricted free agent, Bjugstad opted to remain with the Wild in signing a one-year, $900,000 contract extension on July 5, 2021.

Arizona Coyotes
On July 13, 2022, Bjugstad signed a one-year, $900,000 contract with the Arizona Coyotes.

Edmonton Oilers
On March 2, 2023, the Coyotes traded Bjugstad along with Cam Dineen to the Edmonton Oilers in exchange for a third-round pick in 2023, and prospect Michael Kesselring with Arizona retaining half of Bjugstad's salary.

Personal life

Bjugstad's father, Mike, played Division-III hockey at the University of Wisconsin–Eau Claire, while his uncle, Scott, played at the University of Minnesota before going on to play in the NHL, where he spent a portion of his professional career with the Minnesota North Stars. Scott and Nick have both played for the Pittsburgh Penguins; Scott played 24 games with the team during the 1988–89 season and scored three goals.

During the 2013–14 season, Bjugstad finished his class work to graduate with a degree in Business Marketing from the University of Minnesota.

Bjugstad is nicknamed “Rotisserie Chicken” after he skipped dinner with his Panthers teammates and opted to purchase rotisserie chicken at Publix instead.  Amused fans would often throw chicken wings onto the ice as a result.

Career statistics

Regular season and playoffs

International

Awards and honors

References

External links
 

1992 births
Living people
AHCA Division I men's ice hockey All-Americans
American men's ice hockey centers
Arizona Coyotes players
Edmonton Oilers players
Florida Panthers draft picks
Florida Panthers players
Ice hockey people from Minneapolis
Minnesota Golden Gophers men's ice hockey players
Minnesota Wild players
National Hockey League first-round draft picks
Pittsburgh Penguins players
USA Hockey National Team Development Program players